Dorothy Dworkin (née Dorothy Goldstick; 1889 – August 13, 1976) was a Jewish Canadian nurse, businesswoman and philanthropist. In 2009, she was made a Person of National Historic Significance. She was involved in planning Toronto’s first Jewish hospital where prospective Jewish doctors could work and study.

Biography
Dorothy Dworkin was born to Wolf and Sara Goldstick in Windau, in the Courland Governorate of the Russian Empire (present-day Latvia). She had six sisters and four brothers. In 1904, she immigrated with her family to Canada. In 1907, she chose to become a maternity nurse. She spent a year working under Dr. Kaufman and various of his colleagues until Dr. Kaufman suggested that she go to train at Mount Sinai Hospital, Cleveland, where she would train as a midwife. Prior to leaving Toronto, she helped establish a free Jewish Dispensary located at Elizabeth Street near Agnes, which is now Dundas Street, with Ida Siegel and her brother Abe Lewis. She was the dispensary's first nurse. In 1909, she received a diploma from the Medical State Board of Ohio.

In 1910, Dworkin helped form a Women’s Auxiliary in Toronto with a group of missionaries, and became its first president. The auxiliary would eventually grow into an orphanage.

In 1911, she married Henry Dworkin, a Ukrainian businessman who dealt motor accessories and was the founder of the Toronto Labour Lyceum. In 1917, Henry opened a small variety store with his brother Edward named E&H. Dworkin Steamship and Bankers. The store eventually became a tobacco and shipping agency and was renamed Dworkin Travel. It was located at 525 Dundas Street West. Through the company the Dworkins enabled hundreds of Eastern European Jews to immigrate to Canada prior to World War II, specifically from Poland, Romania, and Latvia. After The Holocaust, they aided survivors in Canada and internationally.

She ran the free Jewish Dispensary in Toronto, and provided health and social services to many immigrant Jews. In 1922, Dworkin helped establish the Toronto Jewish Convalescent and Maternity Hospital after the Toronto General Hospital refused to provide kosher meals and provide for the language needs of its Jewish patients. This institution was later renamed Mount Sinai Hospital, Toronto.

In 1928, her husband died by being fatally struck down by an automobile. It was estimated that as many as 20,000 people attended his funeral. She took control of his business enterprises and became a leader in Toronto's Jewish community.  She served as the secretary of the Jewish Labor Committee in the mid-1930s and was active in the Canadian Jewish Congress, ORT and Pioneer Women. She also sat on a number of boards for Jewish organizations.

Over the years, she also became the honorary president of the Sinais, a member of the Mount Sinai Hospital Board, president of the Continental Steamship Ticket Agents Association, a trustee of the Federation of Jewish Philanthropies, and director of the Labour Lyceum.

She had one daughter, Ellen Dworkin, born in 1912, whom she and her husband affectionately called Honey. Honey would marry Leon Arthurs, an attorney. Their son was Harry Arthurs, the Canadian academic. In late 1925 when she was 13 years old, Ellen commissioned a portrait painting of herself from Frederick Varley that she wanted to present tor her mother as a surprise. She raised funds to pay the fee from members of the Women's Auxiliary.

Legacy
On 6 July 2009, Canada's Environment Minister Jim Prentice officially designated Dworkin as a Person of National Historic Significance:

Jim Flaherty was in attendance and addressed the designation:

Jason Kenney also provided some words concerning Dworkin's contributions:

References

1889 births
1976 deaths
People from Ventspils
People from Courland Governorate
Latvian Jews
Emigrants from the Russian Empire to Canada
Canadian people of Latvian-Jewish descent
Persons of National Historic Significance (Canada)